Asia Pacific College (APC) is a private tertiary education institution in Makati, Metro Manila, Philippines. It was established in 1991 as a non-profit joint venture between IBM Philippines and the SM Foundation. Its program is focused on information technology in consortium with the National University.

The Commission on Higher Education certifies the college as one of the four Centers of Excellence in IT Education in the Philippines.

APC offers the following schools:

 Senior High School
 School of Computing and Information Technologies
 School of Engineering
 School of Management
 School of Multimedia and Arts
 Graduate School

Internship program
The Industry-Academe Cooperative Education Program, also known as the I-ACE Program, is an internship program of the Asia Pacific College, in which students on their senior year are assigned to work full-time for a company for a period of two consecutive terms.

On their senior year, APC students enter the program. They are assigned to work for a company assigned during the internship placement period), for a duration of two consecutive terms of APC's tri-mestral school calendar.

During the internship program, the interns are not expected to enroll in any academic courses in school for they will be working full-time (eight hours a day, Mondays to Fridays) at their companies. Interns are invited to attend monthly Saturday sessions with the Career & Placement Office to discuss updates, issues or problems encountered.

References

External links 
 

Universities and colleges in Makati